

Episodes

Season 1 (2000)

Season 2 (2001)

Season 3 (2002)

Season 4 (2003)

Season 5 (2004)

Season 6 (2005)

Season 7 (2006)

Season 8 (2007)

Season 9 (2008)

Season 10 (2008)

Season 11 (2009)

References

 
Lists of American reality television series episodes